The National Union (UN) was a regenerationist Spanish political party launched in January 1900. One of its main members was Joaquín Costa. It had little electoral success and disbanded by 1902.

References

Defunct political parties in Spain
Political parties established in 1900
Political parties disestablished in 1902
1900 establishments in Spain
1902 disestablishments in Spain